Pål McCarthy (born 24 January 1966) is a Norwegian sailor. He competed in the men's 470 event at the 1992 Summer Olympics.

References

External links
 

1966 births
Living people
Norwegian male sailors (sport)
Olympic sailors of Norway
Sailors at the 1992 Summer Olympics – 470
Sportspeople from Kristiansand